Cylindrical multipole moments are the coefficients in a series expansion of a potential that varies logarithmically with the distance to a source, i.e., as . Such potentials arise in the electric potential of long line charges, and the analogous sources for the magnetic potential and gravitational potential.

For clarity, we illustrate the expansion for a single line charge, then generalize to an arbitrary distribution of line charges.  Through this article, the primed coordinates such 
as  refer to the position of the line charge(s), whereas the unprimed coordinates such as  refer to the point at which the potential is being observed.  We use cylindrical coordinates throughout, e.g., an arbitrary vector  has coordinates 
By assumption, the line charges are infinitely long and aligned with the  axis.

Cylindrical multipole moments of a line charge

where  is the shortest distance between the line charge and the observation point. 

By symmetry, the electric potential of an infinite linecharge has no -dependence. The line charge  is the charge per unit length in the -direction, and has units of (charge/length). If the radius  of the observation point is greater than the radius  of the line charge, we may factor out 

and expand the logarithms in powers of 

which may be written as

where the multipole moments are defined as

Conversely, if the radius  of the observation point is less than  the radius  of the line charge, we may factor out  and expand the logarithms in powers of 

which may be written as

where the interior multipole moments are defined as

General cylindrical multipole moments
The generalization to an arbitrary distribution of line charges  is straightforward. The functional form is the same 

and the moments can be written

Note that the  represents the line charge per unit area in the  plane.

Interior cylindrical multipole moments
Similarly, the interior cylindrical multipole expansion has the functional form

where the moments are defined

Interaction energies of cylindrical multipoles
A simple formula for the interaction energy of cylindrical multipoles (charge density 1) with a second charge density can be derived. Let  be the second charge density, and define  as its integral over z

The electrostatic energy is given by the integral of the charge multiplied by the potential due to the cylindrical multipoles

If the cylindrical multipoles are exterior, this equation becomes

This energy formula can be reduced to a remarkably simple form

The analogous formula holds if charge density 1 is composed of interior cylindrical multipoles

As an example, these formulae could be used to determine the interaction energy of a small protein in the electrostatic field of a double-stranded DNA molecule; the latter is relatively straight and bears a constant linear charge density due to the phosphate groups of its backbone.

See also
 Axial multipole moments
 Potential theory
 Quantum cylindrical quadrupole
 Multipole expansion
 Spherical multipole moments

Electromagnetism
Potential theory
Moment (physics)